Los Zodiac (sometimes Los Zodiacs or Los Zodiac's) were a Peruvian rock music band which formed in the 1960s. They toured internationally with successful 45s such as Discos El Virrey, "Bertha Lou", "Balada de la trompeta", "Bésame mucho", "Amor misterioso", "100 toneladas", and "What I Said".

Los Zodiac performed on Peruvian television Channels 5 and 4, on high rating shows such as "La hora de Pablo", "El show de Pedrito Rico", and "El clan del cuatro". 

Los Zodiac performed with singers: Frank Sinatra, Palito Ortega and Leo Dan.

Original Members
Jorge Álvarez Von Maack ("Micky"), singer 
Tito Castagnola ("Goofy"), bass guitar 
Horacio García Bustamante ("Gili"), guitar
Lucho León ("The Topo"), guitar
Alfredo Quevedo Zavala ("El Negro"), dancer 
Lucho Perez ("El Loco"), drummer
Luis Alva, saxophonist and musical director

Peruvian rock music groups